Galeops is an extinct genus of anomodont therapsids from the Middle-Late Permian of South Africa. It was described by Robert Broom in 1912. Some cladistic analyses have recovered it as closely related to dicynodonts.

See also
 List of therapsids

References 

Anomodont genera
Fossil taxa described in 1912
Taxa named by Robert Broom